Empress Li (李皇后, personal name unknown) (died 409?) was an empress whose husband Gao Yun (Emperor Huiyi) is considered, depending on which historical view is involved, to have been either the last emperor of the Xianbei-led Chinese Later Yan dynasty or the first emperor of Later Yan's successor state Northern Yan dynasty.

Very little is known about Empress Li. After Gao Yun became emperor after his adoptive uncle Murong Xi (Emperor Zhaowen) was overthrown in 407, he created her empress in 408.  It is not known whether his crown prince Gao Pengcheng (高彭城) was her son or not. In 409, Gao Yun was assassinated, and general confusion ensued. It appeared that she died in that confusion as well, for when Gao Yun's successor Feng Ba (Emperor Wencheng) buried Gao Yun with imperial honors in 410, Empress Li was buried with Gao Yun.

References 

|- style="text-align: center;"

|-

|- style="text-align: center;"

Later Yan empresses
Northern Yan empresses
409 deaths
Year of birth unknown